Kill Devil Hill or similar,  may refer to:

 Kill Devil Hills, North Carolina, a town in Dare County, North Carolina, United States
 Wright Brothers National Memorial, an American historic site
 Kill Devil Hill (band), an American heavy metal band
 The Kill Devil Hills, an Australian rock band
 Kill Devil Hills (album), a hip hop music album by DJ Muggs and Ill Bill